A Southern Yankee is a 1948 American comedy western film directed by Edward Sedgwick and starring Red Skelton, Brian Donlevy and Arlene Dahl.

The film is loosely based on Buster Keaton's The General (1926). Skelton plays a Union soldier who spies on the Confederacy during the American Civil War. Keaton served as a technical advisor for the film.

Plot

In 1865, Aubrey Filmore works as a bellboy at the Palmer Hotel in St. Louis. Aubrey wants to work as a spy for the federal government and contacts Colonel Clifford M. Baker at the Secret Service to ask if he can help their elite spy unit, but Baker refuses the request.

Posters are distributed warning the public of a cunning spy named the Grey Spider. When Major Jack Drumman comes to stay at the hotel, Aubrey discovers that he is the Grey Spider, but the major catches Aubrey and tries to force him to wear Confederate clothes to look like the Grey Spider so that he can shoot him as a spy.

Before the major's plan is realized, Aubrey accidentally knocks him unconscious. Major Drumman's alluring accomplice Sallyann Weatharby enters and Aubrey falls in love with her. Aubrey agrees to join Sallyann, posing as the Drumman, to a meeting with important Confederate spies.

Before Aubrey leaves the hotel, he leaves a message for Baker telling him of his plans. Aubrey is then involved in a complicated scheme to intercept the Union forces and is given the important task of delivering the Union battle plans to the Confederate General Watkins. He is ordered to meet up with Sallyann at Morgan's Landing, a hospital near the battlefront.

Upon returning to Colonel Baker with the plans, Aubrey helps to make fake plans to replace the real ones, and is reluctantly ordered by the colonel to continue posing as Drumman and also to deliver instructions to a Union spy. Aubrey mixes up the plans and instructions and because he is wearing Confederate and Union uniforms at the same time, both armies shoot at him and he is knocked unconscious. He is carried to Morgan's Landing and Sallyann is there waiting for him as planned.

Sallyann's fiancé Kurt Devlynn, who is also a spy, is there. As Sallyann has fallen in love with Aubrey, she tells Kurt that she now loves Drumman. Aubrey wakes, finds the lost instructions and escapes the hospital.

Kurt tells his men to dress in Union uniforms and intercept Aubrey (whom he believes to be Drumman) to steal the battle plans. When arriving at Sallyann's father's plantation, Aubrey mistakenly delivers the spy instructions instead of the plans, and Union spies steal the plans and Confederate spies retrieve them. General Watkins receives the plans and Aubrey's Union spy contact Captain Lorford receives the instructions.

That night, Aubrey is courting Sallyann when he is supposed to be stealing the plans from the general. The Confederates realize that a Union spy is in the house and set a trap to catch him. But instead of catching Aubrey, they catch the real Grey Spider, Drumman, believing that he is a Union spy.

As everyone thinks that the Union spy has been caught, Aubrey is able to get the plans from General Watkins. But soon after, Drumman's father appears and exposes Aubrey. When Aubrey is brought outside to be executed for treason, he is saved by Sallyann, and end of the war is declared.

Cast
 Red Skelton as Aubrey Filmore
 Brian Donlevy as Kurt Devlynn
 Arlene Dahl as Sallyann Weatharby
 George Coulouris as Maj. Jack Drumman aka The Grey Spider
 Lloyd Gough as Capt. Steve Lorford
 John Ireland as Capt. Jed Calbern
 Minor Watson as Gen. Watkins
 Charles Dingle as Col. Weatherby
 Art Baker as Col. Clifford M. Baker
 Reed Hadley as Fred Munsey
 Arthur Space as Mark Haskins
 Joyce Compton as Hortense Dobson

Reception
The film earned $1,981,000 in the U.S. and Canada and $566,000 elsewhere, resulting in a profit of $263,000.

See also
 List of American films of 1948

References

External links
 
 
 

1948 films
1948 comedy films
1940s Western (genre) comedy films
American black-and-white films
American Civil War films
American Civil War spy films
1930s English-language films
Films directed by Edward Sedgwick
Metro-Goldwyn-Mayer films
Films with screenplays by Buster Keaton
American Western (genre) comedy films